Medlife was an Indian online platform, which provided pharmacy, diagnostics, and e-consultation in India. It was founded in 2014 by Prashant Singh and Tushar Kumar. The company had a central laboratory based in Bangalore and operated in 29 states. In 2021, PharmEasy acquired Medlife, and merged Medlife's operations into its own platform.

History

The company started out as an online platform for medicine delivery and later expanded to offer online doctor consultation and diagnostic services. Medlife offered one consumer-facing mobile app for accessing all three services.

In November 2018, Medlife acquired healthcare start-up EClinic.

In 2019, it acquired Medlabz, a digital healthcare platform, and MyraMed, a medicine-delivery startup.

In August 2019, Ananth Narayanan (former CEO of Myntra) joined Medlife as the Co-Founder and Chief Executive Officer.

According to a Frost and Sullivan report Medlife owns 30 per cent of the e-Pharma market share in India.

In May 2020, Medlife became multilingual, offering Hindi language.

In May 2021, Medlife was acquired reportedly for $250 million by PharmEasy, as a result of which Medlife's operations were discontinued and users were migrated to PharmEasy. The merger made PharmEasy the largest e-pharmacy company in India with 2 million customers.

Funding
Medlife received roughly $30 million from Alkem Laboratories' Family Office. Kumar and Singh also claim to have put $20 million of personal funds into the business.

In April 2019, Medlife received $17 million in funding from Kumar's family trust.

In December 2019, Medlife raised $15.5 million from Wilson Global Opportunities Fund in debt funding.

References

External links

Online pharmacies
Health care companies established in 2014
Indian companies established in 2014
Health care companies of India
Companies established in 2014